Lee is a common surname in English-speaking countries.

In Canada, "Lee" was the 4th-most-common surname outside of Quebec. In the United States during the year 2000 census, "Lee" was the 22nd-most-common surname.

Origins

China 
Lee is a common romanization of the Chinese surname 李, alternatively romanized as Li.

England 

There are several distinct origins of the Lee surname. The most common is derived from Old English lēah, meaning a meadow or forest clearing.

This developed variously into the surnames Lee, Lea, and Leigh.

Ireland 

The name in Ireland has several diverse origins, resulting in widely dispersed clusters of the name in South Western, Western (Galway) and North Eastern Counties. One recognized root was the anglicization of the Irish surname "Ó Laoidigh" which resulted in a number of variants, such as Lee, Lea, and Maclee.  Other Lees have English roots and still others may have derived from the Norman "Du Lea". The 1901 Irish census list 4912 entries primarily in the counties of Galway, Dublin, Cork, Antrim, Limerick and Down.

Norway 

Originating from Norway as "Lie", this surname was altered when it arrived in the Americas in the late 1800s to fit the English language's pronunciation.

People with the surname 

 List of people with the surname Lee

Fictional characters 

 Gregg Lee, a fictional character in the video game Night in the Woods
 Meilin Lee, the main character from the 2022 Disney-Pixar film Turning Red
 Rock Lee, one of the characters from the Naruto anime and manga series
 The Lee Brothers, the main characters from Double Dragon

Places 

A number of places in the US have been named for the various famous people named Lee:

United States
 Lee, Massachusetts
 Lee, New Hampshire
 Lee's Summit, Missouri
 various Fort Lees
 various Leesburgs
 various Leesvilles
 Washington and Lee University
 Lee Township, Michigan
 Lee Township, Minnesota
 Lee County, Florida

See also 

 Lee (given name)
 List of persons with the surname Lee
 Lea (surname) and Leigh (surname), for related English surnames
 Li (surname), for numerous East Asian surnames romanized "Li"
 Li (李), for the most common one
 Lee (Korean name), for its Korean variants
 Lý (Vietnamese name)

References 

English-language surnames
Surnames of English origin
Surnames of Irish origin